Blesok | Shine is the first Macedonian on-line arts and cultural magazine, published bimonthly, in both Macedonian and English.  Its founder and editor-in-chief is the poet Igor Isakovski. 

"Blesok", officially titled "Blesok – literature & other arts" has been published by the Cultural Institution Blesok since 12 March 1998. Besides the webzine, the publisher also has significant production of e-books (on-line and on CD-ROMs), and in hardcopy.

References

External links
 Blesok - Homepage

1998 establishments in the Republic of Macedonia
Bi-monthly magazines
Magazines published in North Macedonia
Macedonian-language magazines
Magazines established in 1998
Online literary magazines
Visual arts magazines